Eili Sild (born 26 October 1942) is an Estonian stage, film, television and radio actress whose career began on the theatre stage in the early 1960s and has spanned over fifty years.

Early life and education
Eili Sild was born in Tallinn. She attended the Tallinn 7th Secondary School (now, the Tallinn English College), graduating in 1961.  In 1963, she graduated from the Tallinn Feature and Newsreel Film Studio (now, Tallinnfilm) and afterwards studied acting at the Lunacharsky State Institute for Theatre Arts (GITIS) (now, the Russian Academy of Theatre Arts) in Moscow, where she graduated in 1976.

Stage career
In 1963, shortly after graduating from the Tallinn Feature and Newsreel Film Studio, Sild began an engagement as an actress at the Ugala theatre in Viljandi. She would remain an actress with the Ugala (with some intermissions) until 1980. Afterward, she joined the Vanalinnastuudio theatre (Old Town Studio theatre) in Tallinn in 1980, leaving in 1996 and becoming a freelance actress.

Notable performances during her years onstage as a theatre actress include those in works by such varied authors and playwrights as: Rainis, Venta Vīgante, Boris Kabur, Gunnars Priede, Oskar Luts, Eduard Vilde, Aldo Nicolaj, Erskine Caldwell, Maxim Gorky, Astrid Lindgren, August Jakobson, Ardi Liives, Hella Wuolijoki, Fyodor Dostoyevsky, Molière, Henrik Ibsen, and Terence Rattigan.

Sild has also performed onstage at many others theatres throughout Estonia, including the Vanemuine in Tartu, the Tallinn City Theatre and the Vana Baskini Teater (Old [Roman] Baskin's Theatre).

Television and radio career
Eili Sild's first prominent television appearance was the character Mari in the 1965 feature-length Ants Kivirähk and Valdur Himbek-directed drama  for Eesti Telefilm. The television film was based on the 1896 novel of the same name by Estonian author Eduard Vilde. Following this, Sild would concentrate on her stage career and not appear in television roles until the early 2000s after she had become a freelance actress.

In 2001 and 2002, Sild appeared as Ellen in two episodes of the popular, long-running Eesti Televisioon (ETV) drama Õnne 13 in 2001 and 2002. In 2010, she made an appearance on an episode of the Kanal 2 crime drama series , and the same year she had a small role on the TV3 comedy-crime series Kättemaksukontor.

Sild has also had a prolific career as a radio theatre actress and as a narrator and presenter. She has appeared frequently on Eesti Rahvusringhääling (ERR) in radio plays and reading monologues and short stories by authors such as A. H. Tammsaare, Lilli Promet, and Jaan Kaplinski, among many others.

Film career
Eili Sild's first substantial film role was that of Maia in the 1964 Grigori Kromanov and Jüri Müür-directed black-and-white drama Põrgupõhja uus Vanapagan for Tallinnfilm, based on the multi-layered eponymously titled 1939 novel by A. H. Tammsaare. This was followed in 1966 by the Jüri Müür-directed drama , also for Tallinnfilm, and based on several works by author Juhan Smuul.

In 1977, Sild was cast in another small role as a housewife in the Jüri Müür-directed Tallinnfilm period piece drama , which was based on the 1926 novel  (The Pastor of Reigi), by Finnish author Aino Kallas.

After a ten year absence, Eili Sild returned to the screen in the role of a witch in the 1987 Tallinnfilm , directed by Helle Karis. The film was an adaptation of Hans Christian Andersen's 1838 fairy tale The Wild Swans. The following year, she appeared in a two minor roles; the Roman Baskin-directed Tallinnfilm dramatic short , based on the 1968 Arvo Valton-penned short story ; and in the Elo Tust-directed short dramatic film , starring Ülle Kaljuste and Enn Kraam. Both film shorts were produced for Tallinnfilm.

In 1992, Sild made a small appearance in the Lembit Ulfsak-directed family comedy , which follows the adventures of two young boys who discover a painting that was believed to be lost long ago. The following year, she appeared in another small role in the Pekka Karjalainen-directed Finnish-Estonian comedy Hysteria.

In 2012, Sild returned to the screen as the character Ilme in the Anna Hints-directed dramatic short , opposite actors Rita Raave and Raivo Trass.

Personal life
Eili Sild married actor and director Heino Torga. The coupled remained married until his death in 2012. They have one child, daughter Mari Torga, who became a television presenter and theatre manager and director. Her nephew is poet and writer Ivar Sild.

References

External links

1942 births
Living people
Estonian stage actresses
Estonian film actresses
Estonian television actresses
20th-century Estonian actresses
21st-century Estonian actresses
Actresses from Tallinn